The 2022–23 Duke Blue Devils men's basketball team represented Duke University during the 2022–23 NCAA Division I men's basketball season. The Blue Devils played their home games at Cameron Indoor Stadium in Durham, North Carolina, as a member of the Atlantic Coast Conference.

After 42 seasons leading Duke, head coach Mike Krzyzewski retired at the end of the 2021–22 season, and associate head coach Jon Scheyer was named as his replacement starting in the 2022–23 season.

Offseason

Departures
Due to COVID-19, the NCAA ruled in October 2020 that the 2020–21 season would not count against the eligibility of any basketball player, thus giving all players the option to return in 2021–22. Additionally, any players who have declared for the 2022 NBA draft—including seniors, who must opt into this year's draft—have the option to return if they make a timely withdrawal from the draft and end any pre-draft relationships with agents. Thus, separate lists will initially be maintained for confirmed and potential departures.

Team departures

Outgoing transfers

Acquisitions

Incoming transfers

2022 recruiting class

2023 recruiting class

2022 NBA Draft

Roster

Schedule

|-
!colspan=9 style=| Exhibition

|-
!colspan=9 style=| Regular season

|-
!colspan=12 style=|ACC tournament

|-
!colspan=12 style=|NCAA tournament

Rankings

*AP does not release post-NCAA Tournament rankings.

References

Duke
2022–23
Duke Blue Devils men's basketball
Duke Blue Devils men's basketball
Duke